Brosville is an unincorporated community in Pittsylvania County, in the U.S. state of Virginia.

Brosville is located approximately 5 miles west of the city limits of Danville, Virginia along U.S. Route 58.

References

Unincorporated communities in Virginia
Unincorporated communities in Pittsylvania County, Virginia